Urdens is a commune in the Gers department in southwestern France.

Geography

Localisation

Hydrography 
The river Auroue forms part of the commune's northeastern border.

Population

See also
Communes of the Gers department

References

Communes of Gers